The 2010 Welwyn Hatfield Borough Council election took place on 6 May 2010 to elect members of Welwyn Hatfield Borough Council in England. This was on the same day as other local elections.

Election result

Ward results

Brookmans Park and Little Heath

Haldens

Handside

Hatfield Central

Hatfield East

Hatfield South

Hatfield Villages

Hatfield West

Hollybush

Howlands

Northaw and Cuffley

Panshanger

Peartree

Sherrads

Welham Green

Welwyn East

References

2010 English local elections
2010
May 2010 events in the United Kingdom